Délis Ahou (born 23 August 1984) is a Nigerien international footballer who plays as a defender for Belgian club Virton.

Early and personal life
Ahou was born in Nantes to a Nigerien father and a French mother.

Career
Ahou began his career with hometown club Nantes in 1999, before later playing for Racing Levallois 92, USJA Carquefou, Gazélec Ajaccio and Angers SCO. Ahou signed for Belgian club Virton in 2010.

International career
Ahou represented France at youth level, but made his senior international debut for Niger in 2010.

References

1984 births
Living people
People with acquired Nigerien citizenship
Nigerien footballers
Niger international footballers
French footballers
French people of Nigerien descent
Nigerien people of French descent
Footballers from Nantes
AS Nancy Lorraine players
Association football defenders